A lozenge, often referred to as a diamond, is a form of rhombus. The definition of lozenge is not strictly fixed, and the word is sometimes used simply as a synonym for rhombus. Most often, though, lozenge refers to a thin rhombus—a rhombus with two acute and two obtuse angles, especially one with acute angles of 45°. The lozenge shape is often used in parquetry (with acute angles that are 360°/n with n being an integer higher than 4, because they can be used to form a set of tiles of the same shape and size, reusable to cover the plane in various geometric patterns as the result of a tiling process called tessellation in mathematics) and as decoration on ceramics, silverware and textiles. It also features in heraldry and playing cards.

Symbolism
The lozenge motif dates from the Neolithic and Paleolithic period in Eastern Europe and represents a sown field and female fertility. The ancient lozenge pattern often shows up in Diamond vault architecture, in traditional dress patterns of Slavic peoples, and in traditional Ukrainian embroidery. The lozenge pattern also appears extensively in Celtic art, art from the Ottoman Empire, and ancient Phrygian art.

The lozenge symbolism is one of the main symbols for women in Berber carpets.
Common Berber jewelry from the Aurès Mountains or Kabylie in Algeria also uses this pattern as a female fertility sign.

In 1658, the English philosopher Sir Thomas Browne published The Garden of Cyrus, subtitled The Quincunciall Lozenge, or Network Plantations of the Ancients, in which he outlined the mystical interconnection of art, nature and the universe via the quincunx pattern. He also suggested therein that ancient plantations were laid out in a lozenge pattern.

Lozenges appear as symbols in ancient classic element systems, in amulets, and in religious symbolism. In playing cards, the symbol for the suit of diamonds is a lozenge.

Encodings
In Unicode, the lozenge is encoded in multiple variants:
 
 
 
 
 
 
 
 
 
 
 
 
 
 
 
 
 

The character is present in DOS code page 437 (at character code 4) and Mac-Roman (at character 215 = 0xd7). The TeX command for the lozenge is \lozenge.

In IBM 026 punched card code the square lozenge variant  is (12-8-4).

Applications

Calculator

On equipment, especially calculators, the lozenge is used to mark the subtotal key. It is standardized in ISO 7000 as symbol ISO-7000-0650 ("Subtotal"). In a similar fashion, the square lozenge (⌑), part of the BCDIC character set, was often used on tabulation listings to indicate second level totals in banking installations in the 1960s.

Computing
The APL programming language uses the lozenge, called diamond, as statement separator.

Camouflage

During the First World War, the Germans developed lozenge camouflage. This camouflage was made up of colored polygons of four or five colors. The repeating patterns often used irregular four-, five- and six-sided polygons, but some contained regular rhombi or hexagons. Because painting such a pattern was very time-consuming, and the paint added considerably to the weight of the aircraft, the pattern was printed on fabric. This pre-printed fabric was used from 1916 until the end of the war, in various forms and colours.

Flags and emblems

Several flags feature lozenges, including the Flag of Brazil, which contains a yellow lozenge at the center. One official flag of Bavaria is entirely made of blue and white lozenges.

Several emblems feature lozenges, including the Emblem of Uttarakhand, one of the twenty-eight states of India.

Heraldry

The lozenge in heraldry is a diamond-shaped charge, usually somewhat narrower than it is tall. A mascle is a voided lozenge—that is, a lozenge with a lozenge-shaped hole in the middle—and the rarer rustre is a lozenge containing a circular hole. A field covered in a pattern of lozenges is described as lozengy; a similar field of mascles is masculy.

Mathematics
In axiomatic set theory, the lozenge refers to the principles known collectively as the diamond principle.

Medicine

Cough tablets have taken the name lozenge, based on their original shape.  According to the Oxford English Dictionary the first use of this sense was in 1530.

In Finland, the lozenge is associated with salmiak, through Apteekin Salmiakki. Thus, the lozenge is commonly called salmiakkikuvio "salmiak shape". The pattern is often used even if the candy is not actually lozenge-shaped.

Military insignia

Finland
In Finnish military ranks, the lozenge is found in the insignia of conscript officer students (one lozenge) and conscript officer candidates (two lozenges).

United States

To implement 10 U.S.C 773, the Secretary of the Navy has prescribed the following distinctive mark for wear by members of military societies which are composed entirely of honorably discharged officers and enlisted personnel, or by the instructors and members of duly organized cadet corps.

"The distinctive mark will be a diamond, 3 inches long by 2 inches wide, of any cloth material. A white distinctive mark will be worn on blue, green, or khaki clothing; and a blue distinctive mark will be worn on white clothing."

"The distinctive mark will be worn on all outer clothing on the right sleeve, at the point of the shoulder, the upper tip of the diamond to be  inch below the shoulder seam."

The lozenge is used in the Army, Marine Corps, and Air Force on the insignia of their respective first sergeants. It is also used in the cadet programs of Army ROTC, Army and Marine Corps Junior ROTC, and the Civil Air Patrol as rank insignia of cadet officers corresponding to the military pay grades of O-4 to O-6 (Cadet Major, Cadet Lieutenant Colonel, and Cadet Colonel).

Modal logic
In modal logic, the lozenge expresses that there is "possibility." For example, the expression  expresses that it is possible that  is true.

Traffic signs

The lozenge (technically a mascle) can be used on public roadways in the United States and Canada to mark a specific lane for a particular use. The lane will usually be painted with a lozenge at a regular interval, and signage will be installed to indicate the restrictions on using the lane. This marking is most often used to denote high-occupancy vehicle lanes or bus lanes, with accompanying signage reading "◊ HOV LANE" or "◊ BUS LANE" and giving the requirements for a vehicle to be accepted. Prior to 17 January 2006, lozenges could also be used to mark bicycle-only lanes, often in conjunction with a bicycle icon.

In Japan and South Korea, a lozenge marked in white paint on the road indicates an upcoming uncontrolled pedestrian crossing. Similarly, in New Zealand a lozenge marked in white paint on the road may be placed to indicate an upcoming pedestrian crossing. 

In the United Kingdom, lozenges are used on tramway signs. For instance, speed limits are shown as a black lozenge on a white background, containing the speed limit in kilometres per hour.

In many parts of Europe, traffic from the right has right of way at all junctions, unless otherwise stipulated. A yellow lozenge is used (typically on major routes) to indicate that the rule does not apply to the current route.

A hollow lozenge is also used in the signage of waterways to identify a hazard. A cross is placed in the lozenge, dividing it in four, to mark a restricted area.

Travel industry
In travel agencies, where it is known as the "pillow symbol", the square lozenge  appears on the specialist keyboards used with booking terminals. In the 1960s, it was used in banking and for other purposes.

Imagery

See also
 Parallelepiped, 3-D Lozenge
 Petrosomatoglyph, lozenges as symbols in prehistory

Notes

References

External links
 

Types of quadrilaterals
Logic symbols